Maslovka is a village (selo) in Valuysky District, Belgorod Oblast, Russia.

Maslovka may also refer to:

 Maslovka, Prokhorovsky District, Belgorod Oblast, a selo
 Maslovka, Medvensky District, Kursk Oblast, a village
 Maslovka, Voronezh Oblast, a selo

See also
 Maslov, a Russian surname